Onteora Central School District is a school district  in Boiceville, New York, United States.

The superintendent is Victoria McLaren.
Emily Sherry is the president of the board of education.

Schools
The district operates the following schools:
Onteora High School
Onteora Middle School 
Bennett Elementary School
Phoenicia Elementary School 
Woodstock Elementary School

External links
Official site
Alternative URL for official site

School districts in New York (state)
Education in Ulster County, New York